"Koloseum" is a song by Marika Gombitová released on OPUS in 1987.

The composition, written by the singer herself with lyrics by Kamil Peteraj, is considered one of her most recognized works, earning several awards and nominations in addition. The POPulár award for the 2nd Best Video (1987) and the annual Zlatý Triangel award as Best Video (1988).

Its music video (directed by Ladislav Kaboš) featured on the VHS compilation Ateliér duše, released in 1987 on Videofilm SFT Koliba.

Official versions
 "Koloseum" - Studio version, 1987

Credits and personnel
 Marika Gombitová - lead vocal, writer
 Vašo Patejdl - piano, keyboards, LinnDrum computer, chorus
 Kamil Peteraj - lyrics
 Juraj Burian - electric and acoustic guitar
 Andrej Šeban - electric guitar
 Michal Důžek - chorus
 Peter Penthor - chorus
 Štefan Danko - responsible editor
 Peter Smolinský - producer
 Juraj Filo - sound director
 Jozef Krajčovič - sound director
 Ivan Minárik - technical coordination

Awards

POPulár
POPulár was a Slovak music magazine that mapped the domestic and international music scene, maintaining also POP awards. The magazine was published monthly since 1970, until its termination in 1992 (Note: In July 2008, the magazine was restored by Nový Populár, issued twice a month). Gombitová won four times as the Best Female Singer (1983, 1986, 1987-8), and once she received the Best Album award (1987).

Triangel
Zlatý Triangel was an annual video chart also broadcast by the public television network Slovenská televízia from 1984 to 1997. The show, originally hosted by Tatiana Kulíšková and Pavol Juráň, and since November 1989 by Daniel Junas, awarded exclusively Slovak and Czech artists for the best videos released in a calendar year, similarly as the MTV music channel. Prior to that, its monthly editions called Triangel were held. Gombitová won four annual charts in total (in 1985-86, 1988 and 1995).

Hit storočia
The Hit storočia  was a national TV competition organized by Slovenská televízia. Within its three-month run (set of on April 20, 2007), the viewers voted live the most popular Slovak songs from the 1930s to 1990s. Overall, nine songs were picked to compete in the Finale evening (July 6, 2007). Gombitová entered the show with three songs, winning with a song written by Janko Lehotský and Kamil Peteraj, "Vyznanie" from 1979.

Cover versions
2006: Pavol Hammel, Robo Grigorov and Miko Hladký featuring Sláčikový orchester
2007: Martina Schindlerová

See also
 Marika Gombitová discography
 Marika Gombitová awards

References

General

Specific

1987 songs
1987 singles
Marika Gombitová songs
Songs written by Marika Gombitová
Songs written by Kamil Peteraj
Slovak-language songs